The Mill Covered Bridge is a replica historic covered bridge carrying Spring Road across the First Branch White River in Tunbridge, Vermont.  It was built in 2000, nearly replicating a previous structure built on the site in 1883 and lost due to ice damage.  It is one of a high concentration of covered bridges in Tunbridge and Chelsea.  The 1883 bridge was listed on the National Register of Historic Places in 1974.

Description and history
The Mill Covered Bridge is located on the north side of Tunbridge village, where it carries Spring Road across the First Branch White River, west of Vermont Route 110. It is located among the buildings of the former Hayward and Kibby Mill, a 19th-century mill complex. It is a single-span structure, with multiple kingpost trusses resting on abutments of stone and concrete. The trusses are reinforced by wrought iron rods, which provide lateral bracing often provided by wooden members in other bridges. The exterior consists of a metal roof and vertical board siding, the latter extending around the portals and a short way into the interior. The floor consists of planking laid parallel to the trusses on supporting stringers.

The historic bridge was built about 1883 by Arthur G. Adams, a local carpenter credited with construction of a number of Tunbridge's five surviving covered bridges. These bridges, along with another in nearby Chelsea, form a remarkable concentration of 19th-century covered bridges in the state.  This bridge was severely damaged by ice floes in March 1999 and subsequently demolished. A substantially similar bridge was completed on the site the following year.

See also

National Register of Historic Places listings in Orange County, Vermont
List of Vermont covered bridges
List of bridges on the National Register of Historic Places in Vermont

References

Covered bridges on the National Register of Historic Places in Vermont
National Register of Historic Places in Orange County, Vermont
Bridges completed in 1883
Covered bridges in Orange County, Vermont
Buildings and structures in Tunbridge, Vermont
Road bridges on the National Register of Historic Places in Vermont
Wooden bridges in Vermont
King post truss bridges in the United States
Historic district contributing properties in Vermont
1883 establishments in Vermont
Bridges completed in 2000
2000 establishments in Vermont